Wilhelm Freiherr von Roggendorf (1481 – 25 August 1541) was an Austrian military commander and Hofmeister.

Wilhelm von Roggendorf served the Habsburgs starting in 1491. He was Stadtholder of  Friesland between 1517 and 1520, and was in the second half of the 1520s Hofmeister of  Ferdinand I, Holy Roman Emperor. In the winter of 1523-1524 was the chief of the German infantry in the Spanish army which invaded the north of the Kingdom of Navarre and the Bearn. Later he took part in the recovering of the city-fortress of Hondarribia, conquered by the French admiral Bonnivet three years before. During the Siege of Vienna in 1529 by the Turks, he served as commander of the heavy cavalry under his brother-in-law Nicholas, Count of Salm (1459–1530). In the following years he had an influential role at the Austrian court as Obersthofmeister. He resigned in 1539, but returned as commander of the Austrian Siege of Buda, which ended in disaster. Von Roggendorf was wounded during this battle and died two days later of his wounds.

Bibliography 
 Alfred Kohler: Ferdinand I. 1503-1564  Fürst, König und Kaiser. C. H. Beck, München 2003, 
 Christian Brandstätter: Stadtchronik Wien. Christian Brandstätter Verlag, Wien/München 1986, 

1481 births
1541 deaths
15th-century Austrian people
16th-century Austrian people
Austrian generals
Barons of Austria